Me and Kaminski is a 2003 novel by the Austrian-German writer Daniel Kehlmann. It tells the story of a "klutzy journalist" who goes on a journey with an elderly painter he is writing a biography about.

Reception
Jake Kerridge wrote in The Daily Telegraph: "It is over a century since George Gissing described the whole business of biography as 'a farce'. That is the view Kehlmann takes, not only in the sense that the biography industry is trivial and contemptible, but also that it is so absurd as to be a source of entertainment. Hence this sparkling and consistently amusing comedy, by turns broad and sophisticated."

Adaptions
The novel was adapted to stage by Anna Maria Krassnigg as Ich und Kaminski premiering on June 25, 2008.
A film adaptation directed by Wolfgang Becker and starring Daniel Brühl as the biographer and Jesper Christensen as Kaminski, premiered on September 17, 2015 in Germany.

See also
 2003 in literature
 German literature

References

2003 German novels
Austrian novels adapted into films
Austrian novels adapted into plays
German novels adapted into films
German novels adapted into plays
German-language novels
Novels by Daniel Kehlmann
Novels about writers
Novels about artists
21st-century Austrian novels